AAO, AAo or aao may refer to:

Organizations
 Administrative Appeals Office, an office within United States Citizenship and Immigration Services
 American Academy of Ophthalmology
 American Academy of Optometry
 American Academy of Osteopathy
 American Association of Orthodontists

Places
 Anaco Airport (IATA code AAO), Anaco, Venezuela
 Andrushivka Astronomical Observatory, an observatory in Ukraine
 Australian Astronomical Observatory, an observatory in Australia
 Colonel James Jabara Airport (FAA LID: AAO), Wichita, Kansas, United States

Science and Technology
 Acer Aspire One, a subcompact notebook computer
 Alert, awake, and oriented, a measure of level of consciousness
 Amino acid oxidase, any of several enzymes
 D-amino acid oxidase, which catalyzes D-amino acids, producing imino acids, ammonia, and hydrogen peroxide
 L-amino-acid oxidase, which catalyzes L-amino acids, producing keto acids, ammonia, and hydrogen peroxide
 Anodic Aluminum Oxide
 Antarctic oscillation, a low-frequency mode of atmospheric variability of the southern hemisphere
 Ascending aorta (usually as "AAo")

Other uses
 aao, ISO-639-3 code for the Saharan Arabic language
 a.a.O., am angegebenen Ort, or Loc. cit. in German publications
 Aktionsanalytische Organisation, former Austrian/German commune
 America's Army, a computer game series